Madhav Sadashiv Gore (1921–2010) was an Indian social scientist, writer, academic and the chancellor of Jawaharlal Nehru University, Delhi. He was the Director of Tata Institute of Social Sciences (TISS), the vice-chancellor of the University of Mumbai and a recipient of the Life Time Achievement Award of Indian Sociological Society. 

The Government of India awarded him the third highest civilian honour of the Padma Bhushan, in 1975, for his contributions to social sciences.

Biography 
Gore was born on 15 August 1921 at Hubli in the south Indian state of Karnataka to Sadashiv Ramchandra and Venutai and completed his graduation with honors from University of Mumbai in 1942. Joining Tata Institute of Social Sciences, he secured the post-graduate Diploma in Social Service Administration (DSSA) in 1945 during which time he was selected for the Sir Dorabji Tata Research Fellowship. After obtaining a master's degree in sociology from University of Mumbai in 1948, he started his career as a lecturer at the Delhi School of Social Work the same year where he served as the principal from 1953 to 1962. During this period, he continued his doctoral research and secured a doctoral degree (PhD) from Columbia University in 1961; he would later publish his thesis, The Impact of Industrialization and Urbanization on the Aggarwal Family in Delhi Area as a book in 1990, truncating the name as Urbanization and Family Change. In between, he served as a visiting professor at Beloit College of the University of Wisconsin during 1960–61.

In 1962, Gore moved back to Mumbai and took up the post of the director of Tata Institute of Social Sciences and continued there till his superannuation in 1982. Afterwards, he returned to research on the backward class leadership in the state on a Homi Bhabha Fellowship but, a year later, he was appointed as the vice-chancellor of University of Mumbai, a post he held till 1986 when he resigned in protest from the position, allegedly due to a scandal involving award of extra marks to the daughter of Shivajirao Patil Nilangekar, the then chief minister of Maharashtra. In 1997, he became the Chancellor of Jawaharlal Nehru University and stayed at the post till 2002.

Gore published several articles and books including Social work and Social Work Education, Urbanization and Family Change, Social Aspects Of Development, Education and Modernization in India and Vitthal Ramji Shinde: An Assessment of His Contributions. He was the president of organizations such as the Indian Society of Criminology from 1977 to 1979, Indian Sociological Society from 1981 to 1982 and the Association of Indian Universities from 1984 to 1985. He was the president of the Indian chapter of the International Association of Schools of Social Work from 1962 to 1966, during which time he served as the vice-president of the parent association. The Government of India awarded him the civilian honor of the Padma Bhushan in 1975 and he received the Lifetime Achievement Award of the Indian Sociological Society in 2006. He was also a recipient of the Special Award of the Indian Council of Social Welfare.

Gore was married to Phyllis and the couple had two children, Vikas and Anita. He died on 19 November 2010 at his home town of Hubli, at the age of 89.

Selected bibliography

See also 

 Tata Institute of Social Sciences
 University of Mumbai
 Jawaharlal Nehru University
 Delhi School of Social Work

References 

Recipients of the Padma Bhushan in science & engineering
1921 births
2010 deaths
Heads of universities and colleges in India
Indian sociologists
Indian male writers
Academic staff of Jawaharlal Nehru University
University of Mumbai people
University of Mumbai alumni
Columbia University School of Social Work alumni
People from Hubli
Scholars from Karnataka
20th-century Indian non-fiction writers
21st-century Indian educational theorists
20th-century Indian educational theorists
Indian social sciences writers